The Survivors Club is a 2004 CBS television film directed by Christopher Leitch and starring Roma Downey, Jacqueline Bisset and Lauren Lee Smith as rape survivors. It is based on Lisa Gardner's novel of the same name. It premiered on 7 March 2004.

Plot
Jilian (Downey), Carol (Bisset) and Meg (Smith) share a devastating ordeal, they were all rape victims of a vicious killer. They decide to help the police in their hunt for the perpetrator. However, on the first day of his trial he is assassinated by a sniper. His death makes suspects of the three women as a murder case enfolds.

Cast
 Roma Downey as Jilian Hayes
 Jacqueline Bisset as Carol Rosen
 Brian Markinson as David Price
 Lauren Lee Smith as Meg Pesaturo
 Jerry Wasserman as Fitz Fitzpatrick
 Lorena Gale as Lt. Marcy Morelli
 James Remar as Roan Grifin
 Belinda Metz as Linda Pesaturo
 Michael Kopsa as Vinnie Pesaturo
Pamela Diaz as Tawnya Como
 Bill Mondy as Jack Collins

References

External links

2004 television films
2004 films
Canadian television films
English-language Canadian films
Films based on American novels
Films shot in Canada
CBS network films
Films directed by Christopher Leitch
2000s Canadian films